Amy Clarke (pen name, Mrs. Henry Clarke; 17 April 1853 – 4 March 1908), was an English writer of historical fiction and children's books.

Life
The daughter of Joseph Henry Key and Elizabeth Hosking, Clarke was born Amy Key in Plymouth in 1853. She started writing when young, publishing a story in the magazine Good Words when she was 16. At 20, she obtained a first in the Cambridge Examination and began teaching at Plymouth High School for Girls. Two years later she took a year's leave to read mathematics at Newnham College, Cambridge. She left Plymouth High School in 1880 to become the first headmistress of Truro High School for Girls.

Clarke still continued her education, attending London University to earn an external MA. While at university, she met the lecturer Henry Clarke, whom she married in 1889. They had four children: John Henry Clarke (born 1891), Walter Oakley Clarke (1892), Amy Key Clarke (1893–1980) and Wilfrid Kinton Clarke (1894). After her marriage, Clarke limited her teaching to occasional lectures at Westfield College. Her main occupation became writing.

In 1908, she died of cancer.

Selected works
A Clever Daughter, illustrated by Ida Lovering. Sunday School Union (1896)
A High School Girl, or, The Secret of the Old Bureau, illustrated by H. A. Boole. Sunday School Union (1895)
A Lad of Devon, illustrated. Nelson (1898)
A Trusty Rebel, or, A Follower of Warbeck, illustrated by Walter C. Grieve. Nelson
A Village Tyrant, illustrated by Walter S. Stacey. SPCK
Dorothy's Discovery, illustrated by John Jellicoe. Sunday School Union
Gipsy Dick, or, Two Little Brothers, illustrated by H. M. Brock (frontispiece) and Richard Tod. Blackie
Honor Pentreath, a story in two parts, illustrated. SPCK
Hope's Legacy, or, The Ardleighs of Ardleigh, illustrated. Sunday School Union (1895)
In Jacobite Days - being a Plain Narrative of certain Events connected with the Landing of his late Majesty King William at Torbay, and with the burning of the Town of Teignmouth by the French, written by the Rev. Gilbert Lane, D D, Rector of Withycombe in the County of Devon, illustrated by G. C. Hindley. Nelson
Into Stormy Waters. Sunday School Union (1901)
James Godfrey's Wife, illustrated by F. Barnard. SPCK, (1894)
Jennifer's Fortune, illustrated, SPCK (1893)
Little Miss Vanity, illustrated by Walter S. Stacey. Blackie
Matthew Parkyn, illustrated by Walter S. Stacey. SPCK (1896)
Miss Merivale's Mistake, illustrated by Florence Meyerheim. Sunday School Union
reprinted by The Echo Library (2007) 
Webster's Thesaurus Editions in various languages (2008) 
Nan's Schooldays, illustrated by Dorothy Travers-Pope. Sunday School Union
Put to the Proof, illustrated by Will Dodds. Blackie (1903)
Small format, illustrated by R. H. Brock. Blackie
Ralph the Outlaw, a Tale of Adventure in Mediæval England, illustrated. Nelson
Roscorla Farm, illustrated by  W. H. Overend. SPCK 
Roskelly of Roskelly, illustrated  by Walter S. Stacey. SPCK (1900)
Rueben Thorne's Temptation, illustrated by J. Nash. SPCK
Teddy's Adventures, illustrated by E. A. Cubitt. Blackie
That Boy Jim, illustrated by S. B. Pearse. Blackie
The Bushranger's Secret, illustrated by Walter S. Stacey. Blackie
The Coplestone Cousins, illustrated. SPCK (1905)
The Fairclough Family, illustrated by G. Demain Hammond. Blackie (1903)
The Mystery of the Manor House, illustrated by Harold Copping. Blackie (1898)
The Ravensworth Scholarship, a High School Story for Girls, illustrated by John H. Bacon. Blackie
The Roskerry Treasure, A Tale of Wyatt's Rebellion, illustrated. Nelson

References

External links

1853 births
1908 deaths
19th-century English women writers
19th-century English writers
19th-century British writers
Victorian women writers
Victorian writers
English children's writers
Alumni of Newnham College, Cambridge